Brendan O'Brien was once a journalist on RTÉ One's Prime Time current affairs programme, he worked for RTE from 1973 until 2002.

In 1983, O'Brien won a Jacob's Award for his reporting on the RTÉ current affairs programme, Today Tonight.

He is noted for his report and investigation of Martin Cahill where he follows the criminal and confronts him in the street.

In 2008, O'Brien won the Irish Children's Book of the Year Award for The Story of Ireland. He has also written about the history of the IRA.

He worked from 2005 until 2010 for the independent radio station Newstalk presenting The Saturday Edition.

O'Brien is a graduate of Trinity College Dublin, and the University of Ulster.

References

Year of birth missing (living people)
Living people
Jacob's Award winners
RTÉ newsreaders and journalists
Newstalk presenters
Alumni of Trinity College Dublin
Alumni of Ulster University